Granrudmoen is the largest village in Øyer Municipality in Innlandet county, Norway. The village is located in the Gudbrandsdal valley, along the Gudbrandsdalslågen river in the southern part of the municipality. It is the commercial centre of the municipality.

Granrudmoen is located close to the 1994 Winter Olympic venues of Hafjell and Hunderfossen. The local multi-sports team is Øyer-Tretten IF.

Name
The village is named Granrudmoen. The first element is the name is taken from the small Granrud farm which means 'the clearing among the spruces'. The last element of the name is moen which means 'the moor' or 'the heath'.

References

Øyer
Villages in Innlandet
Populated places on the Gudbrandsdalslågen